Bahrain plays a modest, moderating role in regional politics and adheres to the views of the Arab League on Middle East peace and Palestinian rights. Since achieving independence in 1971, Bahrain has maintained friendly relations with most of its neighbours and with the world community. It generally pursues a policy of close consultation with neighbouring states and works to narrow areas of disagreement.

Bahrain is a member of the Cooperation Council for the Arab States of the Gulf (GCC), established on May 26, 1981, with five other Persian Gulf states. The country has fully complied with steps taken by the GCC to coordinate economic development and defense and security planning. In December 1994, it concurred with the GCC decision to drop secondary and tertiary boycotts against Israel. In many instances, it has established special bilateral trade agreements.

Bahrain's current Minister of Foreign Affairs is Abdullatif bin Rashid Al Zayani. Its previous foreign minister was Sheikh Khaled bin Ahmed Al Khalifa, a career diplomat. Sheikh Khaled was educated in the United States, as a student he was a member of US President Jimmy Carter's 1980 presidential campaign team. His deputy was Nazar Al Baharna, a politician and business leader, who was appointed in 2006 following the victory of the biggest Shia party Al Wefaq in that year's parliamentary elections. Al Baharna was formerly a leading member of Al Wefaq.

In June 2006, Bahrain was elected head of the United Nations General Assembly, and used the honour to appoint Haya bint Rashid Al Khalifa as the Assembly's president, making her the first Middle East woman and only the third woman in history to take over the post. Sheikha Haya is a leading Bahraini lawyer and women's rights advocate who took over the post at a time of change for the world body. UN Secretary General Kofi Annan said of her, "I met her yesterday and I found her quite impressive. All the member states are determined to work with her and to support her, and I think she's going to bring a new dimension to the work here." The move follows a series of appointments of women to high-profile positions in the Kingdom (see Women's political rights in Bahrain for further details).

During the Persian Gulf War in 1990–91, Bahrain was part of the coalition that fought to liberate Kuwait. Bahraini, RAF, and USAF pilots flew air strikes in Iraq from the Sheik Isa Air Base, while coalition navies operated out of Manama, the capital. Bahrain was hit by Scud missiles fired from Iraq. A number of Bahraini students studying in Iraq and Kuwait at the outbreak of hostilities went missing and are presumed the victims of Saddam Hussein's secret police.

After the liberation of Kuwait, Bahrain and the United States strengthened their already good ties by signing a ten-year agreement in October 1991, which granted American forces access to Bahraini facilities and allowed the U.S. to pre-position war material for future crises. In July 1995 the U.S. 5th Fleet was established in the Persian Gulf with its headquarters at NSA Bahrain in Manama. In 2003, U.S. President George W. Bush designated Bahrain as a major non-NATO ally.

Bahrain was an active member of the coalition that fought to remove the Taliban regime from Afghanistan in 2001; the Kingdom provided ships for the naval cordon in the Indian Ocean put in place to intercept fleeing Taliban and Al Qaeda fighters.

However, the Kingdom opposed unilateral action against Iraq in 2003, and to the annoyance of Washington in the run up to the war sought to defuse the crisis by offering Saddam Hussein asylum as a way of avoiding war.

Bahrain-Iran relations have been strained since the Iranian Revolution and the 1981 discovery of a planned Iran-sponsored coup in Bahrain. Bahraini suspicions of the Iranian role in local unrest in the mid-1990s remain. However, with the decline of Iraq as a regional powerbroker, Bahrain has begun taking steps to improve relations with Iran and increase regional harmony. These efforts have included encouraging Bahrain-Iran trade.

The long-standing territorial dispute with Qatar over the Hawar Islands and the maritime boundary were resolved in 2001 by a compromise decision of the International Court of Justice (ICJ).

To mark Mahatma Gandhi's birthday on 2 October 2007, the Ministry of Foreign Affairs co-sponsored with the Bahrain Centre for Studies and Research and the Indian Embassy a conference on the relevance of Mahatma Gandhi’s philosophy for the Arab world in the 21st Century. The conference, attended by Arab and Indian academics, UN officials and diplomats discussed the Gandhi’s teaching of non-violence, austerity and spiritualism with particular reference to the Arab world today. Among the keynote speakers was leading liberal academic, Dr Abdulla Al Madani, who emphasised Gandhi’s moral vision: "Had he resorted to kidnapping, suicide-bombings, beheadings, or other barbarian means, his memory would not have remained rooted in the world's conscience. Believing that the credibility of one's action lay in setting a personal example, Gandhi began with himself. He quit his legal practice, gave up wearing Western-style clothing, and embraced a humble lifestyle by making his own clothes and living on a simple vegetarian diet. This, of course, differs from the practice of leaders of some Arab resistance movements, who urge their followers to boycott the West while savouring the Western lifestyle, products, and technology."

Relations with Thailand and the Hakeem al-Araibi incident

Bahrain's foreign relations were put under strain and its human rights record under the spotlight when in November 2018 Bahraini footballer Hakeem al-Araibi, who had been sentenced in absentia by Bahrain to 10 years in prison for vandalising a police station in 2013, was arrested upon arrival in Thailand with his wife for their honeymoon. The footballer, who had been granted refugee status by Australia in 2014, urged the Thailand authorities not to deport him to Bahrain as he had been previously tortured in Bahrain for his political views.

He was kept in detention in Thailand while the Australian government and many international organisations and individuals lobbied for his release, until it was announced on 11 February 2019 by the Thai Office of the Attorney-General (OAG) that the extradition case against al-Araibi had been dropped by the criminal court at Bahrain's request. No reason was given by the foreign ministry, but the decision was made under Section 21 of the Prosecution Act, which allows for cases to be dropped if not in the public interest, and he would be released and allowed to return to Australia as soon as possible.

During the media frenzy surrounding the case, the strong links between Bahrain and Thailand were alluded to in the press. 
Academics and human rights groups raised the issue of the very close ties between the two countries, both financially and between the two royal families. According to Dr Aim Sinpeng, an expert in South-East Asian politics at the University of Sydney, the Thai and Bahraini royal families have always had a close relationship and the Bahraini royal family visits Thailand every year. Thai Deputy Prime Minister and Minister of Foreign Affairs Surapong Tovichakchaikul said in 2012 that the relationship between Thailand and Bahrain “was very close and strong” and also disclosed that the Bahrain Prime Minister was a “close personal friend” of former Thai prime minister Thaksin Shinawatra and had “donated roughly $2 million of his own money” to Thailand for flood relief.

The latest new business venture between the two countries is a new  6,700 sq. m. Thai shopping centre in Manama, set to launch in the first half of 2019 and described as an opportunity for Thai small and medium-sized enterprises to reach a huge potential market of Saudi shoppers, said to be the biggest economic centre in Bahrain, with import and exports between the two countries expected to be worth around US$400m annually.

Bilateral relations

See also
 Ministry of Foreign Affairs
 List of diplomatic missions in Bahrain
 List of diplomatic missions of Bahrain
 Territorial disputes in the Persian Gulf

References